The Journal of the Operational Research Society is a peer-reviewed academic journal covering operations research. It is an official journal of The Operational Research Society and has been in existence since 1950. It publishes full length case-oriented papers, full length theoretical papers, technical notes, discussions (viewpoints) and book reviews.

History
The journal began as Operational Research Quarterly in 1950. At that time it was published by the Operational Research Club (Great Britain). It was published four times a year until 1978 (from 1953–1969 under the title OR) when it became a monthly publication and the name was changed to Journal of the Operational Research Society.

Abstracting and indexing 
The journal is abstracted and indexed by ABI/INFORM, Compendex, Current Contents/Engineering, Computing & Technology, Current Contents/Social & Behavioural Sciences, Inspec, Science Citation Index, Social Sciences Citation Index, Scopus, and Zentralblatt MATH.

Scope 
Some idea of the scope and contents of the journal can be found in a survey of papers published during the period 2000-2009.

 51.7% of papers were theoretical while 31.3% were case-orientated.

References

External links 
 

Publications established in 1950
Monthly journals
Business and management journals
English-language journals
1950 establishments in the United Kingdom
Operational Research Society academic journals